Heliopolis is a 2009 Egyptian independent musical documentary film by Ahmad Abdalla that tells the story of a group of young people during a winter day in the Cairo suburb of Heliopolis. Heliopolis is Ahmad Abdalla's debut feature film and starring Khaled Abol Naga.

Synopsis 
The events of one day in the lives of a number of Cairo residents is a portrayal of unfulfilled dreams and frustrating details of life in the overpopulated Metropolis. Their paths cross and their stories overlap but they are caught up in their struggle and are oblivious to one another against the background of what used to be one of Cairo's most glamorous neighborhoods. The City's vanishing glory and fading history is documented through the characters strife to make it through one day in Heliopolis.... The one thing they all share is the knowledge that they will probably have to confront the City again and again over the following days. Most of the stories taking a place in the suburb of Heliopolis

Cast 
 Khaled Abol Naga (Ibrahim)
 Hanan Motwea (Engy)
 Christine Solomon (Gothic Girl)
 Hany Adel (Dr. Hany)
 Yosra El Lozy (Sara)
 Mohammed Brekaa (The Soldier)
 Somaya Gouini (Reem)
 Atef yousef (Ali)
 Aya Soliman (Maha)
 Ayda Abdel Aziz (Vera)
 Tamer El-Said (Nagy)
 Hend Sabry (Nagla)
 Mahmoud El-Lozy (Photographer)

Festivals and awards
The film was officially selected by the Toronto International Film Festival in the Discovery section and later at the Vancouver International Film Festival. And it had its Arabic regional premiere in the Middle East International Film Festival.

The European premiere is in the official competition at the 50th edition of Thessaloniki Film Festival in Greece.

Additional festivals:

 Official competition at the 9th edition of International Film Festival of Marrakech in Morocco
 Official competition at the 26th edition of Festival International du Film d'Amour de Mons in Brussels
 The Original script won the best first screenplay award of Sawiris Foundation in December 2007
 Official competition at 15th international film festival Kerala (on 10 to 17 December)

External links
 
 
 
 Variety Review, Variety Review,2009
 Blast Magazine, Christine Solomon on Heliopolis, 2009
 Heliopolis in the Toronto International Film Festival

2009 films
2000s Arabic-language films
Egyptian independent films
Egyptian documentary films
2009 documentary films
2009 directorial debut films
2009 independent films